Saša Kalajdžić (born 7 July 1997) is an Austrian professional footballer who plays as a striker for Premier League club Wolverhampton Wanderers and the Austria national team.

Kalajdžić began his senior career playing in the third and fourth tiers of Austrian football with SR Donaufeld Wien. In 2016, he signed for Austrian Bundesliga club Admira Wacker, where he scored 12 goals in 35 games for the first team. He joined German club Stuttgart in July 2019, sustaining a serious knee injury shortly after joining and not making his debut until May 2020. He scored 24 goals in 60 games for Stuttgart. In August 2022, he was signed by English club Wolverhampton Wanderers for a reported fee of £15 million.

Kalajdžić played for Austria at under-21 level, before making his senior international debut in October 2020. He was part of Austria's squad at Euro 2020.

Club career

FC Admira Wacker Mödling
Kalajdžić joined FC Admira Wacker Mödling in 2016, from SR Donaufeld Wien. He originally played as a midfielder for the club's reserve side in the Austrian Regionalliga East, before being converted into a forward.

VfB Stuttgart
On 5 July 2019, Kalajdžić signed a four-year contract with the German club VfB Stuttgart. Shortly after his arrival, he suffered a torn cruciate ligament during a preseason training camp. He made his league debut on 28 May 2020, coming on as a substitute in the 78th minute of matchday 28 of the 2019–20 2. Bundesliga season against Hamburger SV, and scored his first goal on matchday 33 during a 6–0 rout of FC Nuremberg.

In the following season, Kalajdžić frequently led the line for VfB Stuttgart, finishing the season as the 6th top scorer in the Bundesliga with 16 goals, helping his team finish 9th. The next season, he scored the winner in Stuttgart's 3–2 win over Borussia Mönchengladbach on matchday 25, and the team's first goal in a 2–1 win over 1. FC Köln on the final matchday, to ensure the club's presence in the Bundesliga for the 2022–23 season.

Wolverhampton Wanderers
On 31 August 2022, English club Wolverhampton Wanderers announced that they had signed Kalajdžić on a five-year-deal, with the option to extend for a further 12 months. The fee was undisclosed by the club, but was reported to be £15 million. He made his debut three days later as a starter in a 1–0 Premier League win against Southampton at Molineux, but was substituted at half-time due to injury which was later confirmed as an ACL tear requiring surgery. Wolves subsequently announced that the player underwent reparative surgery on 6 September, and cautioned that the typical rehabilitation period after such a procedure is nine months.

International career
Kalajdžić made six appearances for Austria at under-21 level. He made his senior international debut for Austria on 14 October 2020, in a Nations League 1–0 win against Romania, as an added-time substitute for Michael Gregoritsch. On 25 March 2021, he scored his first two international goals in a 2–2 away draw with Scotland during 2022 FIFA World Cup qualification. He was included in the squad for Euro 2020, where he scored a goal in a 2–1 loss after extra-time against Italy in the round of 16.

Style of play
Due to his two-metre stature and relatively slender build, Kalajdžić received comparisons with the English striker Peter Crouch, who similarly to him functioned as an out-and-out target man. During his youth career, Kalajdžić also played as a holding midfielder and referred to Nemanja Matić as an inspiration.

Personal life
Born in Austria, Kalajdžić is of Serbian descent.

Career statistics

Club

International

Scores and results list Austria's goal tally first, score column indicates score after each Kalajdžić goal.

References

External links

 Profile at the Wolverhampton Wanderers F.C. website
 
 Profile at Austrian Football Association

1997 births
Living people
Austrian people of Serbian descent
Footballers from Vienna
Austrian footballers
Association football forwards
FC Admira Wacker Mödling players
VfB Stuttgart players
Wolverhampton Wanderers F.C. players
Austrian Football Bundesliga players
Austrian Regionalliga players
Bundesliga players
2. Bundesliga players
Premier League players
Austria under-21 international footballers
Austria international footballers
UEFA Euro 2020 players
Austrian expatriate footballers
Austrian expatriate sportspeople in Germany
Austrian expatriate sportspeople in England
Expatriate footballers in Germany
Expatriate footballers in England